Richard James Saykally (born September 10, 1947) is an American chemist.  He is currently the Class of 1932 Endowed Professor of Chemistry at the University of California, Berkeley.  He has received numerous awards for his research on the molecular characteristics of water and aqueous solutions.

Biography
Saykally was born in Rhinelander, Wisconsin and educated at University of Wisconsin-Eau Claire and University of Wisconsin–Madison, where he received his PhD under R. Claude Woods in 1977. Saykally has been a professor at the University of California, Berkeley since 1979 after postgraduate research at the National Institute of Standards and Technology with Kenneth Melvin Evenson. Saykally and his students have pioneered many important advances in spectroscopy, including velocity modulation spectroscopy of ions, terahertz laser vibration-rotation-tunneling spectroscopy of clusters, infrared photon counting spectroscopy, cavity ringdown spectroscopy, and X-ray spectroscopy of liquid microjets. These have permitted the first detailed study of important textbook molecules, including the hydronium (H3O+), hydroxide (OH−) and ammonium (NH4+) ions, as well as small water clusters and carbon clusters.

Recent work includes the spectroscopic determination of a universal water force field via the study of water clusters, the development of femtosecond nonlinear optical molecular imaging methods applied to single nanowire lasers and biological systems, femtosecond Deep UV SHG/SFG studies of liquid electrolyte interfaces, and soft X-ray spectroscopy of liquids and liquid surfaces.

Honors and awards
A co-author of over 400 publications that have been cited over 50,000 times (H index > 100), the recipient of over 75 honors and awards from 15 different countries, Saykally is a member of the National Academy of Sciences and the American Academy of Arts and Sciences, and in 2004 received the Ernest Orlando Lawrence Award from the U.S. Department of Energy, the Hinshelwood Lectureship from Oxford University and the Inaugural International Solvay Chair in Chemistry from the Solvay Institutes of Belgium. He is a UC-Berkeley Distinguished Teacher, and has been active at the national level in science education. Over 150 students and postdocs have trained under his direction, many of whom hold prominent positions in academic, government, and industrial institutions.

 Camille and Henry Dreyfus Award (1979)
Presidential Young Investigator Award (1984)
named to Miller Research Professor Chair (1985–1986)
E. K. Plyler Prize for Molecular Spectroscopy (1989)
 Michelson Prize for Spectroscopy (1989)
 Lippincott Medal for Spectroscopy (1992)
 Berkeley Distinguished Teaching Award (1992)
 American Chemical Society Harrison Howe Award (1992)
 Royal Society of Chemistry Bourke Award (1992)
 Churchill Fellowship at University of Cambridge (1995)
 Humboldt Senior Scientist Award (1995)
named Fellow of American Academy of Arts and Sciences (1995)
named Fellow of the American Physical Society (1989)
named Fellow of the Optical Society of America
named Fellow of the Royal Society of Chemistry
named Member of United States National Academy of Sciences (1999)
 Pittsburgh Spectroscopy Award (1999)
ACS Irving Langmuir Prize in Chemical Physics (2000)
Royal Society of Chemistry's Centenary Medal (2000)
 Ernest Orlando Lawrence Award (2004)
 Johannes Markus Marci Medal (Czechoslovakia)(2004)
filled the Morino Lectureship chair (Japan)(2005)
filled the University of Oxford Hinshelwood Lectureship chair (2006)
filled the Inaugural Solvay Chair in Chemistry (Belgium)(2008)
 ACS Peter Debye Award in Physical Chemistry (2009)
 Golden Jubilee Thematic Lectures (Indian Institute for Technology, Delhi) (2011)
 Morris Travers Lectures (Indian Institute of Science, Bangalore) (2011)
 J. C. Bose Memorial Lectures (Indian Association for the Cultivation of Science, Kolkata) (2011)
 Royal Society of Chemistry Faraday Lectureship Prize (2012)
delivered the W. A. Noyes Distinguished Lecture in Physical Chemistry (University of Texas, Austin) (2013)
delivered the CaSTL (Chemistry at the Space-Time Limit) Lecture (University of California, Irvine) (2014)
 E. Roger Washburn Memorial Lectureship in Physical Chemistry (University of Nebraska) (2016)
named Keynote Speaker NANOLYTICA (Simon Fraser University) (2017)
 E. Bright Wilson Award in Spectroscopy (American Chemical Society) (2017)
received the Jean Dreyfus Lectureship (Hobart and William Smith Colleges) (2018)
delivered the BESE Distinguished Lecture (KAUST, Saudi Arabia) (2018)
 SCS Lectureship (Swiss Chemical Society) (2018)Helmholtz International Fellowship Award (Helmholtz Society, Berlin) (2018)
 Inaugural Claude and Janice Trottier Endowed Lectureship (University of Rhode Island) (2019)The Cross Lecture in Physical Chemistry'' (University of Washington) (2021)

Current research interests
As of 2019, Saykally's active research includes:
Terahertz laser spectroscopy of clusters
X-ray spectroscopy of liquids and interfaces
Nonlinear optical spectroscopy of liquids and interfaces
Chemical interactions on liquid surfaces
X-ray laser nonlinear optical spectroscopy

References

External links
Saykally Group Website
UC Berkeley College of Chemistry Listing for Richard J. Saykally

American physical chemists
UC Berkeley College of Chemistry faculty
1947 births
Living people
University of Wisconsin–Madison alumni
University of Wisconsin–Eau Claire alumni
Members of the United States National Academy of Sciences
Spectroscopists
Faraday Lecturers
People from Rhinelander, Wisconsin
Fellows of the American Physical Society